Inyankuni River is a river in Zimbabwe.

Rivers of Zimbabwe